The Federer family is an old Swiss family that is part of the bourgeoisie of Berneck, St. Gallen. The family originated in the 5th century and rose to prominence in the Middle Ages, with members holding local government offices under the Prince-Abbots of the Abbey of St. Gallen. Notable members of the family include the tennis player Roger Federer, the Catholic priest and writer Heinrich Federer, and the politician Barbara Schmid-Federer.

History 
The Federer family originates in the 5th century from the village of Berneck, St. Gallen in northeastern Switzerland, near the Austrian border. As part of the Swiss bourgeoisie, members of the family were entitled to positions in the local government. The name Federer translates from the Swiss German word for "feather" or "quill", referencing the family's role as scribes in Berneck. In 1544, Ulrich Federer served as the Ammann of Berneck for the Prince-Abbots of St. Gallen. Sebastian Federer served as Ammann in 1665. The Federer family coat of arms includes a gold cross atop a white feather on a red shield.

In 1525, during the Reformation in Switzerland, the population of Berneck converted from Catholicism to Protestantism, following the teachings of Huldrych Zwingli. By 1532, the Federer family had converted back to Catholicism.

In 1848 Berneck suffered a great fire that destroyed over one hundred buildings in the village. A branch of the Federer family were blamed by the rest of the clan for the fire, and were cast out of the municipality. Members of the family later settled in Baden, Eichberg, St. Gallen, and Rebstein.

In 2019, Jakob Federer served as the vice president of Berneck.

Notable members 
Josef Anton Sebastian Federer (1793–1868), Swiss theologian and politician 
Heinrich Federer (1866–1928), Swiss writer and Catholic priest
Mirka Federer (b. 1978), Swiss tennis player
Roger Federer (b. 1981), Swiss tennis player
Urban Federer (b. 1968), Swiss prelate of the Catholic Church
Barbara Schmid-Federer (b.1965), Swiss politician

See also 
 Federer (surname)

References 

 
Roman Catholic families
Swiss families